Jaime Royal "Robbie" Robertson, OC (born July 5, 1943), is a Canadian musician. He is best known for his work as lead guitarist and songwriter for the Band, and for his career as a solo recording artist. With the deaths of Richard Manuel in 1986, Rick Danko in 1999, and Levon Helm in 2012, Robertson is one of only two living original members of the Band, with the other being Garth Hudson.

Robertson's work with the Band was instrumental in creating the Americana music genre. Robertson has been inducted into the Rock and Roll Hall of Fame and the Canadian Music Hall of Fame as a member of the Band, and has been inducted to Canada's Walk of Fame, both with the Band and on his own. He is ranked 59th in Rolling Stone magazine's list of the 100 greatest guitarists. As a songwriter, Robertson is credited for writing "The Weight", "The Night They Drove Old Dixie Down", "Up on Cripple Creek" with the Band, and had solo hits with "Broken Arrow" and "Somewhere Down the Crazy River", and many others. He has been inducted into the Canadian Songwriters Hall of Fame, and received a Lifetime Achievement Award from the National Academy of Songwriters.

As a film soundtrack producer and composer, Robertson is known for his collaborations with director Martin Scorsese, which began with the rockumentary film The Last Waltz (1978), and continued through a number of dramatic films, including Raging Bull (1980), The King of Comedy (1983), Casino (1995), The Departed (2006), The Wolf of Wall Street (2013) and The Irishman (2019). He has worked on many other soundtracks for film and television.

Early life
Robertson was born Jaime Royal Robertson on July 5, 1943. He was an only child. His mother was Rosemarie Dolly Chrysler, born February 6, 1922. She was Cayuga and Mohawk, raised on the Six Nations Reserve southwest of Toronto, Ontario. Chrysler lived with an aunt in the Cabbagetown neighbourhood of Toronto and worked at the Coro jewellery plating factory. She met James Patrick Robertson at the factory and they married in 1942.

Rosemarie and James Robertson continued to work at the factory where they met. The family lived in several homes in different Toronto neighbourhoods when Robbie was a child. He often travelled with his mother to the Six Nations Reserve to visit her family. It was here that Robertson was mentored in playing guitar by family members, in particular his older cousin Herb Myke. He became a fan of rock 'n' roll and R&B through the radio, listening to disc jockey George "Hound Dog" Lorenz play rock 'n' roll on WKBW in Buffalo, New York, and staying up at night to listen to disc jockey John R.'s all-night blues show on WLAC, a clear-channel station in Nashville, Tennessee.

When Robertson was in his early teens, his parents separated. His mother revealed to Robertson that his biological father was not James, but Alexander David Klegerman, a Jewish man whom she had met working at the Coro factory. He became a professional gambler and was killed in a hit-and-run accident on the Queen Elizabeth Way. She had been with him while James Robertson was stationed in Newfoundland with the Canadian Army, before she married James. After telling Robertson, his mother arranged for the youth to meet his paternal uncles Morris (Morrie) and Nathan (Natie) Klegerman.

Career
When Robertson was 14, he worked two brief summer jobs in the travelling carnival circuit, first for a few days in a suburb of Toronto, and later as an assistant at a freak show for three weeks during the Canadian National Exhibition. He drew from this for his song "Life is a Carnival" (with the Band) and the movie Carny (1980), which he produced and starred in.

The first band Robertson joined was Little Caesar and the Consuls, formed in 1956 by pianist/vocalist Bruce Morshead and guitarist Gene MacLellan. He stayed with the group for almost a year, playing popular songs of the day at local teen dances. In 1957 he formed Robbie and the Rhythm Chords with his friend Pete "Thumper" Traynor (who would later found Traynor Amplifiers). They changed the name to Robbie and the Robots after they watched the film Forbidden Planet and took a liking to the film's character Robby the Robot. Traynor customized Robertson's guitar for the Robots, fitting it with antennae and wires to give it a space age look. Traynor and Robertson joined with pianist Scott Cushnie and became The Suedes. At a Suedes show on October 5, 1959, when they played CHUM Radio's Hif Fi Club on Toronto's Merton Street, Ronnie Hawkins first became aware of them and was impressed enough to join them for a few numbers.

With Ronnie Hawkins and the Hawks
Robertson began shadowing Hawkins. After the Suedes opened for the Arkansas-based rockabilly group Ronnie Hawkins and the Hawks at Dixie Arena, Hawkins hired Robertson for the Hawks' road crew. Hawkins recorded two songs co-credited to Robertson, "Hey Baba Lou" and "Someone Like You", for his album Mr. Dynamo (1959), and brought Robertson to the Brill Building in New York City to help him choose songs for the rest of the album.

Hawkins hired pianist Scott Cushnie away from the Suedes, and took him on tour in Arkansas with the Hawks. When the Hawks' bass player left the group, Cushnie recommended that Hawkins hire Robertson to replace him on bass.

Hawkins invited Robertson to Arkansas, and then flew to the UK to perform on television there. Left in Arkansas, Robertson spent his living allowance on records and practised intensively each day. Upon returning, Hawkins hired him to play bass. Cushnie left the band a few months later. Robertson soon switched from bass to playing lead guitar for the Hawks. Robertson developed into a guitar virtuoso.

Roy Buchanan, a few years older than Robertson, was briefly a member of the Hawks and became an important influence on Robertson's guitar style: "Standing next to Buchanan on stage for several months, Robertson was able to absorb Buchanan's deft manipulations with his volume speed dial, his tendency to bend multiple strings for steel guitar-like effect, his rapid sweep picking and his passion for bending past the root and fifth notes during solo flights."

Drummer/singer Levon Helm was already a member of the Hawks and soon became close friends with Robertson. The Hawks continued to tour the United States and Canada, adding Rick Danko, Richard Manuel, and Garth Hudson to the Hawks lineup in 1961.

This lineup, which later became the Band, toured with Hawkins throughout 1962 and into 1963. They also hired the saxophone player Jerry Penfound and later Bruce Bruno, who were both with the group in their intermediary period as Levon and the Hawks.

Ronnie Hawkins and the Hawks cut sessions for Roulette Records throughout 1961–1963, all of which Robertson appeared on. The sessions included three singles: "Come Love" b/w "I Feel Good" (Roulette 4400 1961); "Who Do You Love" b/w "Bo Diddley" (Roulette 4483 1963); and "There's A Screw Loose" b/w "High Blood Pressure" (Roulette 4502 1963).

With Levon and the Hawks
The Hawks left Ronnie Hawkins at the beginning of 1964 to go on their own. The members of the Hawks were losing interest in playing in the rockabilly style and favoured blues and soul music. In early 1964, the group approached agent Harold Kudlets about representing them, which he agreed to do, booking them a year's worth of shows in the same circuits as they had been in before with Ronnie Hawkins. Originally dubbed The Levon Helm Sextet, the group included all of the future members of the Band, plus Jerry Penfound on saxophone and Bob Bruno on vocals.

After Bruno left in May 1964, the group changed their name to Levon and the Hawks. Penfound stayed with the group until 1965. Kudlets kept the group busy performing throughout 1964 and into 1965, finally booking them into two lengthy summer engagements at the popular nightclub Tony Mart's in Somers Point, New Jersey, at the Shore. They played six nights a week alongside Conway Twitty and other acts.

The members of Levon and the Hawks befriended blues artist John P. Hammond while he was performing in Toronto in 1964. Later in the year, the group agreed to work on Hammond's album So Many Roads (released in 1965) at the same time that they were playing the Peppermint Lounge in New York City. Robertson played guitar throughout the album, and was billed "Jaime R. Robertson" in the album's credits.

Levon and the Hawks cut a single "Uh Uh Uh" b/w "Leave Me Alone" under the name the Canadian Squires in March 1965. Both songs were written by Robertson. The single was recorded in New York and released on Apex Records in the United States and on Ware Records in Canada. As Levon and the Hawks, the group cut an afternoon session for Atco Records later in 1965, which yielded two singles, "The Stones I Throw" b/w "He Don't Love You" (Atco 6383) and "Go, Go, Liza Jane" b/w "He Don't Love You" (Atco 6625). Robertson also wrote all three of the tracks on Levon and the Hawks' Atco singles.

With Bob Dylan and the Hawks

1965–1966 World Tour

Toward the end of Levon and the Hawks' second engagement at Tony Mart's in New Jersey, in August 1965, Robertson received a call from Albert Grossman Management requesting a meeting with singer Bob Dylan. The group had been recommended to both Grossman and to Dylan by Mary Martin, one of Grossman's employees; she was originally from Toronto and was a friend of the band. Dylan was also aware of the group through his friend John Hammond, whose album So Many Roads members of the Hawks had performed on.

Robertson agreed to meet with Dylan. Initially, Dylan intended simply to hire Robertson as the guitarist for his backing group. Robertson refused the offer, but did agree to play two shows with Dylan, one at the Forest Hills Tennis Stadium in Forest Hills, New York on August 28, and one at the Hollywood Bowl in Los Angeles on September 3. Robertson suggested they use Levon Helm on drums for the shows.

Robertson and Helm performed in Dylan's backing band, along with Harvey Brooks and Al Kooper for both shows. The first at Forest Hills received a predominantly hostile response, but the second in Los Angeles was received slightly more favourably. Dylan flew up to Toronto and rehearsed with Levon and the Hawks September 15–17, as Levon and the Hawks finished an engagement there, and hired the full band for his upcoming tour.

Bob Dylan and the Hawks toured the United States throughout October–December 1965, with each show consisting of two sets: an acoustic show featuring only Dylan on guitar and harmonica, and an electric set featuring Dylan backed by the Hawks. The tours were largely met with a hostile reaction from fans who knew Dylan as a prominent figure in the American folk music revival, and thought  his move into rock music a betrayal. Helm left the group after their November 28 performance in Washington, D.C. Session drummer Bobby Gregg replaced Helm for the December dates, and Sandy Konikoff was brought in to replace Gregg in January 1966.

Dylan and the Hawks played more dates in the continental United States in February–March 1966 of the 1966 world tour. From April 9-May 27, they played Hawaii, Australia, Europe, and the UK and Ireland. Drummer Sandy Konikoff left after the Pacific Northwest dates in March, and Mickey Jones replaced him, staying with the group for the remainder of the tour. The Australian and European legs of the tour received a particularly harsh response from disgruntled folk fans. The May 17 Manchester Free Trade Hall show is best known for an angry audience member audibly yelling "Judas!" at Dylan; it became a frequently-bootlegged live show from the tour, was eventually released officially as The Bootleg Series Vol. 4: Bob Dylan Live 1966, The "Royal Albert Hall" Concert. 

The European leg of the tour was filmed by documentary filmmaker D. A. Pennebaker, but completion of a planned film was delayed. After recovering from an accident, Dylan decided to edit it himself. ABC television rejected it, and it was never commercially released. It was screened as Eat the Document in 1972 at the Whitney Museum in New York.

On November 30, 1965, Dylan cut a studio session with members of the Hawks, which yielded the non-LP single "Can You Please Crawl Out Your Window?" Dylan completed the Blonde on Blonde album in Nashville in mid-February 1966, employing Robertson for one of these sessions, which took place on February 14.

The "Basement Tapes" period

 
On July 29, 1966, Dylan sustained an injured neck from a motorcycle accident, and retreated to a quiet domestic life with his new wife and child in upstate New York. Some of the members of the Hawks were living at the Chelsea Hotel in New York City at the time, and were kept on a weekly retainer by Dylan's management.

In February 1967, Dylan invited the members of the Hawks to come up to Woodstock, New York to work on music. Robertson had met a French-Canadian woman on the Paris stop of Dylan's 1966 world tour, and the two moved into a house in the Woodstock area. The remaining three members of the Hawks rented a house near West Saugerties, New York; it was later dubbed "Big Pink" because of its pink exterior.

Dylan and the members of the Hawks worked together at the "Big Pink" house every day to rehearse and generate ideas for new songs, many of which they recorded in "Big Pink"'s makeshift basement studio. The recordings were made between the late spring and autumn of 1967. Previous Hawks member Levon Helm returned to the group in August 1967. By this time, Robertson's guitar style had evolved to be more supportive of the song and less devoted to displaying speed and virtuosity.

In time, word about these sessions began to circulate, and in 1968, Rolling Stone magazine co-founder Jann Wenner brought attention to these tracks in an article entitled "Dylan's Basement Tape Should Be Released".

In 1969, a bootleg album with a plain white cover compiled by two incognito music industry insiders featured a collection of seven tracks from these sessions. The album, which became known as The Great White Wonder, began to appear in independent record stores and receive radio airplay. This album became a runaway success and helped to launch the bootleg recording industry.

In 1975, Robertson would produce an official compilation, The Basement Tapes, which included a selection of tracks from the sessions. An exhaustive collection of all 138 extant recordings was released in 2014 as The Bootleg Series Vol. 11: The Basement Tapes Complete.

With the Band

1967–1968 (Music From Big Pink)

In late 1967, Dylan left to record his next album, John Wesley Harding (1967). After recording the basic tracks, Dylan asked Robertson and Garth Hudson about playing on the album to fill out the sound. However, when Robertson heard the tracks, he liked the starkness of the sound and recommended that Dylan leave the songs as they were. Dylan worked with the members of the Hawks again when they appeared as his backup band at two Woody Guthrie memorial concerts at Carnegie Hall in New York City in January 1968. Three of these performances were later released by Columbia Records on the LP A Tribute to Woody Guthrie, Vol. 1 (1972).

Over the course of the "Basement Tapes" period, the group had developed a sound of their own, and Grossman went to Los Angeles to shop the group to a major label, securing a contract with Capitol Records. The group went to New York to begin recording songs with music producer John Simon. Capitol brought the group to Los Angeles to finish the album. The resulting album, Music From Big Pink, was released in August 1968.

Robertson wrote four of the songs on Music From Big Pink, including "The Weight", "Chest Fever", "Caledonia Mission," and "To Kingdom Come". Robertson is listed in the songwriting credits as "J.R. Robertson". Robertson sang lead vocal on the track "To Kingdom Come"; he would not sing on another Band song released to the public until "Knockin' Lost John" on 1977's Islands. Two of Robertson's compositions for the album, "The Weight" and "Chest Fever", would become important touchstones in the group's career. "The Weight" was influenced by the films of director Luis Buñuel, in particular Nazarín (1959) and Viridiana (1961), and reflects the recurring theme in Buñuel's films about the impossibility of sainthood. The song portrays an individual who attempts to take a saintly pilgrimage, and becomes mired down with requests from other people to do favors for them along the way. The mention of "Nazareth" at the beginning of the song refers to Nazareth, Pennsylvania, where the C. F. Martin & Company guitar manufacturer is located; it was inspired by Robertson seeing the word "Nazareth" in the hole of his Martin guitar. Although "The Weight" reached #21 on the British radio charts, it did not fare as well on the American charts, initially stalling at #63.

But the song gained traction following more successful covers by Jackie DeShannon (US #55, 1968), Aretha Franklin (US #19, 1969), and the Supremes with the Temptations (US #46, 1969), and the song's inclusion in the movie Easy Rider (1969), which became a runaway success. "The Weight" has since become the Band's best known song. It has been covered by many artists, appeared in dozens of films and documentaries, and has become a staple in American rock music.

When Music from Big Pink was released in 1968, the Band initially avoided media attention, and discouraged Capitol Records from promotional efforts. They also did not immediately pursue touring to support the album, and declined to be interviewed for a year. The resulting mystery surrounding the group prompted speculation in the underground press. Music from Big Pink received excellent reviews, and the album influenced many well-known musicians of the period.

1969 The Band

In early 1969, the Band rented a home from Sammy Davis Jr. in Hollywood Hills, and converted the pool house behind it into a studio to recreate the "clubhouse" atmosphere that they had previously enjoyed at "Big Pink". The band began recording every day in the pool house studio, working on a tight schedule to complete the album. An additional three tracks were recorded at The Hit Factory in New York in April 1969. Robertson did most of the audio engineering on the album.

The Band began performing regularly in spring 1969, with their first live dates as the Band taking place at the Winterland Ballroom in San Francisco. Their most notable performances that year were at the 1969 Woodstock Festival and the UK Isle of Wight Festival with Bob Dylan in August.

The Band's album The Band was released in September 1969, and became a critical and commercial success. The album received almost universal critical praise, peaked at #9 on the US pop charts, and stayed in the Top 40 for 24 weeks. The Band works as a loose concept album of Americana themes, and was instrumental in the creation of the Americana music genre. It was included in the Library of Congress' National Recording Registry in 2009.

The song from this album that had the strongest cultural influence was "The Night They Drove Old Dixie Down". The song explores a Confederate man's life after defeat of the South following the American Civil War. It incorporates historical events to create a larger American mythos. Although the Band's original version was not released as a single, a cover version by Joan Baez went to #3 on the charts in 1971 and helped to popularize the song.

Several other tracks from The Band received significant radio airplay, and would become staples in the group's concert appearances. "Up on Cripple Creek" peaked at #25 in late 1969 in the United States, and would be their only Top 30 hit there. "Rag Mama Rag" reached #16 in the UK in April 1970, the highest chart position of any single by the group in that country. "Whispering Pines", co-written by Richard Manuel, was released as a single in France in 1970, and would become the title of a 2009 book about Canadian contributions to the Americana music genre by Jason Schneider. On November 2, 1969, the Band appeared on the Ed Sullivan Show, one of only two television appearances they would make.

1970–1973 (Stage Fright through Moondog Matinee)
On January 12, 1970, the Band was featured on the cover of Time magazine. This was the first time a North American rock band featured on the cover of the magazine.

The Band rented The Woodstock Playhouse in Woodstock, New York with the intent of recording a new live album there, but the city council voted against it, so they recorded on location, but without an audience. Robertson handled most of the songwriting duties as before. Robertson brought in Todd Rundgren to engineer the album which was recorded in two weeks' time. These sessions became their third album, Stage Fright, which would become the Band's highest charting album, peaking at #5 on September 5 and staying in the Billboard Top 40 for 14 weeks.

The Band's next album, Cahoots, was recorded at Albert Grossman's newly built Bearsville Studios and was released in October 1971. The album received mixed reviews, and peaked at #24 on the Billboard charts, only remaining in the Billboard Top 40 for five weeks.

Cahoots is notable for its cover of Bob Dylan's "When I Paint My Masterpiece", as well as for featuring the concert favourite "Life Is a Carnival". The inclusion of "When I Paint My Masterpiece" came about when Dylan stopped by Robertson's home during the recording of Cahoots and Robertson asked if he might have any songs to contribute. That led to Dylan playing an unfinished version of "When I Paint My Masterpiece" for him. Dylan completed the song soon afterwards, and the Band recorded it for the album. "Life Is a Carnival" features horn parts written by producer and arranger Allen Toussaint. It would be the only track from Cahoots the group would keep in their set list through to The Last Waltz concert and film.

The Band continued to tour throughout 1970-71. A live album recorded at a series of shows at the Academy of Music in New York City between December 28–31, 1971, was released in 1972 as the double album Rock Of Ages. Rock of Ages peaked at #6, and remained in the Top 40 for 14 weeks.

After the Academy of Music shows, the Band again retreated from performing live. They returned to the stage on July 28, 1973, to play the Summer Jam at Watkins Glen alongside the Allman Brothers Band and the Grateful Dead. A recording of the Band's performance was released by Capitol Records as the album Live at Watkins Glen in 1995. With over 600,000 people in attendance, the festival set a record for "Pop Festival Attendance" in the Guinness Book of World Records. The record was first published in the 1976 edition of the book.

In October 1973, the Band released an album of cover songs entitled Moondog Matinee, which peaked at #28 on the Billboard charts. Around the time of the recording of Moondog Matinee, Robertson began working on an ambitious project entitled Works that was never finished or released. One lyric from the Works project, "Lay a flower in the snow," was used in Robertson's song "Fallen Angel", which appeared on his 1987 self-titled solo album.

1974 Reunion with Bob Dylan (Planet Waves and Before the Flood)
In February 1973, Bob Dylan relocated from Woodstock, New York to Malibu, California. Coincidentally, Robertson moved to Malibu in the summer of 1973, and by October of the year the rest of the members of the Band had followed suit, moving into properties near Zuma Beach.

David Geffen had signed Dylan to Asylum Records, and worked with promoter Bill Graham on the concept that would become the Bob Dylan and the Band 1974 Tour. It would be Dylan's first tour in more than seven years.

Meanwhile, Bill Graham took out a full-page advertisement for the Bob Dylan and the Band tour in The New York Times. The response was one of the largest in entertainment history up to that point, with between 5 and 6 million requests for tickets mailed in for 650,000 seats. Graham's office ended up selling tickets off on a lottery basis, and Dylan and the Band netted $2 million from the deal.

Amongst the rehearsals and preparations, the Band went into the studio with Bob Dylan to record a new album for Asylum Records that would become the Bob Dylan album Planet Waves (1974). Sessions took place at Village Recorder in West Los Angeles, California, from November 2–14, 1973. Planet Waves was released on February 9, 1974. The album was #1 on the Billboard album charts for four weeks, and spent 12 weeks total in the Billboard Top 40. Planet Waves was Bob Dylan's first #1 album, and the first and only time Bob Dylan and the Band recorded a studio album together.

The 1974 tour began at the Chicago Stadium on January 3, 1974, and ended at The Forum in Inglewood, California on February 14. The shows began with more songs from the new Planet Waves album and with covers that Dylan and the Band liked, but as the tour went on, they moved toward playing older and more familiar material, only keeping "Forever Young" from the Planet Waves album in the set list. Dylan and the Band played a number of tracks from the controversial 1965–1966 World Tour, this time to wildly enthusiastic response from the audience where there had been mixed reaction and boos nine years previously.

The final three shows of the tour at The Forum in Inglewood, California were recorded and assembled into the double album Before the Flood. Credited to "Bob Dylan/The Band", Before the Flood was released by Asylum Records on July 20, 1974. The album debuted at #3 on the Billboard charts, and spent ten weeks in the Top Forty.

1974–1975 (Shangri-La Studios, The Basement Tapes, and Northern Lights – Southern Cross)
Following the 1974 reunion tour with Bob Dylan, rock manager Elliot Roberts booked the Band with the recently reunited Crosby, Stills, Nash, and Young. On September 4, both artists played Wembley Stadium in London, appearing with Jesse Colin Young and Joni Mitchell.

After moving to Malibu in 1973, Robertson and the Band had discovered a ranch in Malibu near Zuma Beach called "Shangri-La", and decided to lease the property. The main house on the property had originally been built by Lost Horizon (1937) actress Margo Albert, and the ranch had been the filming and stabling site for the Mister Ed television show in the 1960s. In the interim, the house had served as a high-class bordello.

The album release of The Basement Tapes, credited to Bob Dylan and the Band, was the first album production that took place in the new studio. The album, produced by Robertson, featured a selection of tapes from the original 1967 Basement Tapes sessions with Dylan, as well as demos for tracks eventually recorded for Music From Big Pink album. Robertson cleaned up the tracks, and the album was released in July 1975.

Shangri-La Studios proved to be a return to a clubhouse atmosphere that the Band had enjoyed previously at Big Pink, and in the spring of 1975, the group began work on Northern Lights – Southern Cross, their first release of original material in four years. One of the best known tracks on the album is "Acadian Driftwood", the first song with specifically Canadian subject material. Robertson was inspired to write "Acadian Driftwood" after seeing the documentary L'Acadie, l'Acadie (1971) on Canadian television while in Montreal. Two other notable tracks from that album are "It Makes No Difference" and "Ophelia".

Northern Lights – Southern Cross was released on November 1, 1975. The album received generally positive reviews, and reached #26 on the Billboard charts, remaining in the Top 40 for five weeks.

1976 (Islands and The Last Waltz concert)
The Band began touring again in June 1976, performing throughout the summer. The members of the Band were splintering off to work on other projects, with Levon Helm building a studio in Woodstock and Rick Danko having been contracted to Arista Records as a solo artist.

While on the summer tour, member Richard Manuel was involved in a boating accident that severely injured his neck, and ten dates of the 25-date tour were cancelled. It was during this time period that Robertson introduced the concept that the Band would cease to operate as a touring act. According to Robertson, the group's mutual agreement was that they would stage one final "grand finale" show, part ways to work on their various projects, and then regroup. Helm later made the case in his autobiography, This Wheel's on Fire, that Robertson had forced the Band's breakup on the rest of the group.

Concert promoter Bill Graham booked the Band at the Winterland Ballroom on Thanksgiving Day, November 25, 1976. The show was intended as a gala event, with ticket prices of $25 per person. The event would include a Thanksgiving dinner served to the audience, and would feature the Band performing with various musical guests. The onstage guest list included Ronnie Hawkins, Muddy Waters, Paul Butterfield, Dr. John, Bob Dylan, Eric Clapton, Van Morrison, Neil Diamond, Joni Mitchell, Neil Young, Emmylou Harris, and others.

Robertson wanted to document the event on film, and approached director Martin Scorsese to see if he would be interested in shooting the concert. The Winterland concert was called The Last Waltz. Robertson and Scorsese developed a 200-page script for the show, listing out in columns the lyrics of the songs, who was singing what part, and what instruments were being featured. It included columns for the camera and lighting work.

Scorsese brought in all-star cameramen such as Michael Chapman, László Kovács and Vilmos Zsigmond to film the show in 35mm. John Simon, producer on the Band's first two albums, was brought in to coordinate rehearsals and work as musical director. Boris Leven was brought in as art director. Jonathan Taplin assumed the role of executive producer, and Robertson worked as producer of the film.

Rehearsals for The Last Waltz concert began in early November. Warner Bros. Records president Mo Ostin offered to finance the production of The Last Waltz film in exchange for the rights to release music from The Last Waltz as an album. However, the group were contractually obligated to supply Capitol Records with one more album before they could be released to work with Warner Bros. So in between rehearsing, the Band worked on the studio album Islands for Capitol. Robertson wrote or co-wrote eight of the ten tracks. One of the songs, "Knockin' Lost John", features Robertson on vocals, and was the first Band song Robertson had sung on since "To Kingdom Come" from Music From Big Pink. "Christmas Must Be Tonight" was inspired by the birth of Robertson's son, Sebastian, in July 1974.

The Last Waltz concert event took place on Thanksgiving Day, November 25, 1976. Approximately five thousand people were in attendance. The event began at 5 pm, beginning with the audience members being served a full traditional Thanksgiving meal at candlelit tables, with a vegetarian table serving an alternate menu as an option. The Berkeley Promenade Orchestra played waltz music for dancing afterwards. The tables were cleared and moved at 8 pm. At 9 pm, the Band played songs for an hour, beginning with "Up On Cripple Creek". Just after 10 pm, Robertson introduced Ronnie Hawkins, the first onstage guest, with a succession of guest stars appearing with the group until just after midnight.

The group took a 30-minute break, during which several Bay Area poets performed readings of their poems. After the break, the Band returned to the stage, performing, among other songs, a new composition entitled "The Last Waltz Theme" that Robertson had just completed less than 48 hours prior. Bob Dylan was brought in at the end of this second set, performing several songs, and finally being joined with the other guest stars for a finale performance of "I Shall Be Released". This was then followed with two all-star jam sessions, after which the Band returned to the stage to close the show with one more song, their rendition of "Baby Don't You Do It".

1977–1978 (The Last Waltz film and album)
After The Last Waltz concert event was finished, director Martin Scorsese had 400 reels of raw footage to work with, and began editing the footage. The film was then sold to United Artists. In the meantime, Robertson and Scorsese continued to brainstorm more ideas for the film. In April 1977, country singer Emmylou Harris and gospel vocal group the Staple Singers were filmed on a sound stage at MGM performing with the Band. Emmylou Harris performed on "Evangeline", a new song written by Robertson, and the Staples Singers performed on a new recording of "The Weight," which they themselves had recorded a version of in 1968. Scorsese's next idea was to intersperse the concert footage with interviews of the Band that told their story. Scorsese conducted the interviews.

The Last Waltz album was released by Warner Brothers Records on April 7, 1978, as a 3-LP set. The first five sides feature live performances from the concert, and the last side contains studio recordings from the MGM sound stage sessions. The album peaked at #16 on the Billboard charts, and remained in the Top 40 for 8 weeks.

The Last Waltz film was released to theatres on April 26, 1978. The film fared well with both rock and film critics. Robertson and Scorsese made appearances throughout America and Europe to promote the film. Over time, The Last Waltz has become lauded by many as an important and pioneering rockumentary. Its influence has been felt on subsequent rock music films such as Talking Heads' Stop Making Sense (1984), and U2's Rattle and Hum (1988).

Production and session work outside of the Band 1970–1977

Robertson produced Jesse Winchester's debut self-titled album, which was released in 1970 on Ampex Records. The album features Robertson playing guitar throughout the album, and co-credits the track "Snow" to Robertson as well.

Robertson played guitar on ex-Beatle Ringo Starr's third solo album, Ringo (1973), performing with four-fifths of the Band on the track "Sunshine Life For Me (Sail Away Raymond)". Robertson contributed a guitar solo on the track "Snookeroo" on Starr's fourth album, Goodnight Vienna (1974).

Robertson played guitar for Joni Mitchell on the track "Raised on Robbery", which was released on her album Court and Spark. In 1974, Robertson also played guitar on Carly Simon's version of "Mockingbird", which featured Simon singing with her then-husband James Taylor.

In 1975, Robertson produced and played guitar on singer/guitarist Hirth Martinez's debut album Hirth From Earth. Bob Dylan had heard Martinez, and recommended him to Robertson. Robertson identified strongly with Martinez' music, helped him to secure a recording contract with Warner Bros. Records, and agreed to produce Martinez' debut album. He also played guitar on Martinez' follow-up album, Big Bright Street (1977).

In 1975, Eric Clapton recorded the album No Reason to Cry at the Band's Shangri-La Studios with help from members of the Band. Robertson played lead guitar on the track "Sign Language".

In the mid-1970s, Robertson connected with singer Neil Diamond, and the two began collaborating on a concept album about the life and struggles of a Tin Pan Alley songwriter. The resulting album, entitled Beautiful Noise, was recorded at Shangri-La Studios in early 1976. It reached #6 on the Billboard charts and remained in the Top 40 for sixteen weeks. Robertson produced the album, co-wrote the track "Dry Your Eyes" with Diamond, and played guitar on "Dry Your Eyes", "Lady-Oh", and "Jungletime". He produced Diamond's live double album Love at the Greek (1977), which was recorded in 1976 at the Greek Theatre in Los Angeles. Love at the Greek reached #8 on the Billboard charts and remained in the Top 40 for nine weeks.

In 1977, Robertson contributed to two album projects from the Band alumni. Robertson played guitar on "Java Blues" on Rick Danko's self-titled debut album, and also played guitar on the Earl King-penned "Sing, Sing, Sing" on the album Levon Helm & the RCO All-Stars.

Also in 1977, Robertson contributed to the second self-titled album by singer-songwriter Libby Titus, who was the former girlfriend of Levon Helm. Robertson produced the track "The Night You Took Me To Barbados In My Dreams" (co-written by Titus and Hirth Martinez), and produced and played guitar on the Cole Porter standard "Miss Otis Regrets".

Film career 1980–1986

Carny (1980) film and soundtrack
After the release of The Last Waltz, MGM/UA, who released the film, viewed Robertson as a potential film actor, and provided Robertson with an office on the MGM lot. During this time, Martin Scorsese's agent, Harry Ulfand, contacted Robertson about the idea of producing a dramatic film about traveling carnivals, which Robertson was drawn to because of his childhood experiences working in carnivals. The screenplay for the film Carny was directed by documentary filmmaker Robert Kaylor.

Although Robertson was initially only intended to be the producer of Carny, he ended up becoming the third lead actor in the film, playing the role of Patch, the patch man. Gary Busey played "Frankie", the carnival bozo and Patch's best friend. Jodie Foster was selected to play the role of Donna, a small town girl who runs away to join the carnival and threatens to come between the two friends. The film cast real life carnies alongside professional film actors, which created a difficult atmosphere on set. Carny opened to theaters on June 13, 1980. Also in 1980, Warner Bros released a soundtrack album for Carny, which is co-credited to Robertson and composer Alex North, who wrote the orchestral score for the film. The soundtrack was re-released on compact disc by Real Gone Music in 2015.

Early collaborations with Martin Scorsese 1980–1986 (Raging Bull, The King of Comedy, The Color of Money)
After the production of Carny was completed, Robertson flew to New York to assist Martin Scorsese on the music for the film Raging Bull (1980).

Robertson and Scorsese would have a long-running working relationship. The former would find and/or create music to underscore the latter's films. Raging Bull was the first of these collaborations. Robertson credits his work on Raging Bull for sparking his interest in the work of sourcing and underscoring music for movies.

Robertson supplied three newly recorded instrumental jazz tracks for sourced music, which he also produced. These three tracks feature Robertson playing guitar, along with performances from the Band alumni Garth Hudson and Richard Manuel. One of the tracks, "Webster Hall", is co-written by Robertson and Garth Hudson. Robertson also worked with Scorsese on selecting the film's opening theme music, choosing the intermezzo from Cavalleria Rusticana by Italian opera composer Pietro Mascagni. The soundtrack was finally released by Capitol Records in 2005 as a 37 track, 2-CD set.

Robertson worked with Scorsese again on his next film, The King of Comedy (1983), and is credited in the film's opening credits for "Music Production". Robertson contributed one original song, "Between Trains," to the film's soundtrack. The song was written in tribute to "Cowboy" Dan Johnson, an assistant of Scorsese's who had recently died. Robertson produced the track, sings lead vocals, and plays guitar and keyboards; the Band alumni Garth Hudson and Richard Manuel appear on the track was well. A soundtrack album for the film was released by Warner Bros. in 1983.

In June 1986, Robertson began working with Scorsese on his next film The Color of Money. In addition to sourcing music for the film, Robertson also composed the film's score; it was the first time Robertson had ever written a dramatic underscore for a film. Robertson brought in Canadian jazz composer Gil Evans to orchestrate the arrangements.

The best known song on The Color of Money soundtrack is Eric Clapton's "It's in the Way That You Use It", which was co-written by Robertson. "It's in the Way That You Use It" reached #1 on the Billboard Mainstream Rock Songs chart in January 1987. Robertson produced a song for the film with blues player Willie Dixon entitled "Don't Tell Me Nothin'"; Dixon's track was co-written with Robertson. The Color of Moneys soundtrack album was released by MCA Records.

Solo career
Geffen Records period
Robbie Robertson (1987)
Robertson began work on his first solo album, Robbie Robertson, in July 1986 after signing to Geffen Records. Robertson chose fellow Canadian Daniel Lanois to produce the album. Much of the album was recorded at The Village Recorder in West Los Angeles, California. He recorded at Bearsville Studios near Woodstock, New York, and also in Dublin, Ireland, with U2, and in Bath, England, with Peter Gabriel. He employed a number of guest artists on the album, including U2, Gabriel, the Bodeans, and Maria McKee. Garth Hudson and Rick Danko also made appearances on the album. Robertson wrote one track, "Fallen Angel", in honor of Richard Manuel, after his passing in March 1986.

Released on October 26, 1987, Robbie Robertson peaked at #35 on the Billboard 200, remaining in the top 40 for three weeks. The album charted even higher in the UK, peaking at #23 on the UK Albums Chart and remaining on the chart for 14 weeks. Robbie Robertson received overwhelming critical acclaim at the time of its release, being listed in the Top-Ten Albums of the Year by several critics in Billboard magazine's 1987 "The Critics' Choice" end of the year feature. The album was listed as #77 in Rolling Stones 1989 list "100 Best Albums of the Eighties."

Robertson had his single largest hit in the UK with "Somewhere Down The Crazy River", which features his spoken word verses contrasted with singing in the choruses. The song reached #15 in the UK Hit Singles chart, and remained in the chart for 11 weeks. The video for "Somewhere Down The Crazy River" was directed by Martin Scorsese, and features Maria McKee in an acting role.

In the US, Robbie Robertson produced several hits on the Billboard Mainstream Rock charts, with "Showdown At Big Sky" coming in the highest (#2) and "Sweet Fire Of Love" the second highest (#7). The album was nominated for a Grammy Award for "Best Rock / Vocal Album", and was certified gold in the United States in 1991. In Canada, Robertson won Album Of The Year, Best Male Vocalist Of The Year and Producer Of The Year at the Juno Award ceremony in 1989.

In 1991, Rod Stewart recorded a version of "Broken Arrow" for his album Vagabond Heart. Stewart's version of the song reached #20 on the Billboard 100 chart in the US and #2 on the Billboard Top Canadian Hit Singles chart in Canada. "Broken Arrow" was performed live by the Grateful Dead with Phil Lesh on vocals.

Storyville (1991)
Storyville was released on September 30, 1991. Robertson headed to New Orleans to collaborate with some of the city's natives like Aaron and Ivan Neville and the Rebirth Brass Band. Once again, Robertson brought in Band alumni Garth Hudson and Rick Danko as contributors. The album reached #69 on the Billboard 200 chart. Storyville received numerous positive reviews, with Rolling Stone giving it 4 1/2 stars out of 5, and the Los Angeles Times awarding it 3 stars out of 4. Two tracks from the album, "What About Now" and "Go Back To Your Woods", charted on the Billboard Mainstream Rock charts at #15 and #32 respectively. The album was nominated for Grammy awards in the categories "Best Rock Vocal Performance (solo)" and "Best Engineer".

Production and session work 1984–1992
In 1984, Robertson co-produced the track "The Best of Everything" with Tom Petty for the Tom Petty and the Heartbreakers album Southern Accents. Robertson also worked on the horn arrangements for the track, and brought in Band alumni Richard Manuel and Garth Hudson as guests.

In 1986, Robertson appeared as a guest on the album Reconciled by the Call, playing guitar on the track "The Morning".

Also in 1986, Robertson was brought on as creative consultant for Hail! Hail! Rock 'n' Roll (1987), a feature film saluting Chuck Berry. Robertson appears in film, interviewing Chuck Berry, and then playing guitar while Berry recites poetry.

In 1988, Robertson collaborated as a songwriter with Lone Justice lead singer Maria McKee. One of the songs they co-wrote, "Nobody's Child", was released on McKee's self-titled debut album in 1989.

In 1989, Robertson recorded and produced a new version of the Band's "Christmas Must Be Tonight" for the Scrooged soundtrack. In 1990, Robertson appeared as a guest on the Ryuichi Sakamoto album Beauty, playing guitar on the song "Romance". He also contributed to the world music video and album production One World One Voice.

In 1992, Robertson produced the song "Love in Time" for Roy Orbison's posthumous album King of Hearts. "Love In Time" was a basic demo Orbison had recorded that was believed to be lost, but had just recently been rediscovered. Robertson set about augmenting Orbison's basic vocal track with new arrangements and instrumentation, with the intent of making it sound like the arrangements were there from the beginning instead of later additions.

Later solo albumsMusic for the Native Americans (1994):
In 1994, Robertson returned to his roots, forming a Native American group called the Red Road Ensemble for Music for the Native Americans, a collection of songs that accompanied a television documentary series produced by TBS. Like his songs, "The Night They Drove Old Dixie Down," and "Acadian Driftwood," Robertson touches on history that connects to his life and family. The Battle Of Wounded Knee and the near extinction of the buffalo in the United States are outlined in the song, "Ghost Dance." Robertson was recognized with a Juno Award for Producer of the Year. The international success of "Mahk Jchi (Heartbeat Drum Song)" inspired a concert in Agrigento, Italy, celebrating Native American music. Robertson headlined the festival along with other Native American musicians, and portions of the live performance appeared in a PBS documentary.

Contact from the Underworld of Redboy (1998):
On Contact from the Underworld of Redboy, Robertson departed from his typical production style and delved deep into a mix of rock, native, and electronic music. He employed the services of Howie B, DJ Premier, and producer Marius de Vries (Björk, Massive Attack). Through the songs on the album, he takes a close look at native traditions like Peyote Healing. The album's opening track, "The Sound Is Fading", samples a recording of a young Native American singer from the 1940s that Robertson got from the Library Of Congress, and the song "Sacrifice" includes parts of an interview from prison with Leonard Peltier set to a soundscape produced by Robertson and de Vries. The racial epithet in the album's title comes from an experience Robertson had where some bullies referred to him as "Red Boy" while he was playing with his cousins. Rolling Stone gave the album 4 out of 5 stars, and Robertson received a Juno Award for Best Music of Aboriginal Canada Recording.

How to Become Clairvoyant (2011):
Released on April 5, 2011, How to Become Clairvoyant is the fifth solo release from Robertson. The album arose from some impromptu demo sessions in Los Angeles with longtime friend Eric Clapton. It features Eric Clapton, Steve Winwood, Trent Reznor, Tom Morello, Robert Randolph, Rocco Deluca, Angela McCluskey, and Taylor Goldsmith of Dawes. Robbie performed "He Don't Live Here No More" on CBS's Late Show with David Letterman and Later... with Jools Holland in support of the album. He also appeared on The Tonight Show Starring Jimmy Fallon performing the song "Straight Down The Line," with Robert Randolph and the Roots.

The album was released in a deluxe edition containing five bonus tracks (four demos and the exclusive track "Houdini", named after the magician Harry Houdini). "How To Become Clairvoyant" debuted at No. 13 on the Billboard 200, marking the highest debut and highest chart position for Robbie's solo works in his career. He teamed with painter and photographer Richard Prince to produce a special limited-edition collector's release of the album. The resulting LP-sized box included an art book, an individually numbered set of five lithographs (including pieces by Prince and photographer Anton Corbijn), a set of original tarot cards, and the original album plus ten bonus tracks. Only 2,500 were made.

Sinematic (2019):
Released on September 20, 2019, Sinematic is Robertson's sixth solo album. It features Van Morrison joining Robertson as dueling hitmen on the track  “I Hear You Paint Houses," as well as other allusions to the world of Scorsese's films. Citizen Cope, Derek Trucks, and Frédéric Yonnet make guest appearances on the album.

Later career

Robertson worked on Martin Scorsese's movies Casino, The Departed, and Gangs of New York, and he provided music supervision for Shutter Island, The Wolf of Wall Street, and Silence. In Rome, he headlined the 1995 annual Labour Day concert festival with supporting acts Andrea Bocelli, Elvis Costello, and Radiohead.

In 1996, as executive soundtrack producer, Robertson heard a demo of Change the World and sent it to Clapton as a suggestion for the soundtrack of Phenomenon, starring John Travolta. Babyface produced the track. Change the World won 1997 Grammy awards for Song of the Year and Record of the Year. In 1999, Robertson contributed songs to Oliver Stone's film, Any Given Sunday.

In 2000, David Geffen and Mo Ostin convinced Robertson to join DreamWorks Records as creative executive. Robertson, who persuaded Nelly Furtado to sign with the company, is actively involved with film projects and developing new artist talent, including signings of A.i., Boomkat, eastmountainsouth, and Dana Glover. On February 9, 2002, Robertson performed "Stomp Dance (Unity)" as part of the opening ceremony of the 2002 Winter Olympic Games in Salt Lake City, Utah. In 2004, he contributed the song "Shine Your Light" to the Ladder 49 soundtrack.

In 2005, Robertson was executive producer of the definitive box set for the Band, entitled A Musical History. In 2006, he recorded with Jerry Lee Lewis on the track "Twilight", a Robertson composition, for Lewis' album Last Man Standing. On July 28, 2007, at Eric Clapton's Crossroads Guitar Festival in Bridgeview, Illinois, Robertson made a rare live appearance. Also in 2007, Robertson accepted an invitation to participate in Goin' Home: A Tribute to Fats Domino (Vanguard). With the group Galactic, Robertson contributed a version of Domino's "Goin' to the River".

For the 2019 Martin Scorsese movie The Irishman, Robertson provided the score and consulted with music supervisor Randall Poster on the entire soundtrack.

Honours and awards
In 1989, the Band was inducted into the Canadian Juno Hall of Fame. In 1994, the Band was inducted into the Rock and Roll Hall of Fame. In 1997, Robertson received a Lifetime Achievement Award from the National Academy of Songwriters. At the 2003 commencement ceremonies at Queen's University in Kingston, Ontario, Robertson delivered an address to the graduating class and was awarded an honorary degree by the university. In 2003, Robertson received the Indspire Aboriginal Lifetime Achievement Award.

In 2003, Robertson was inducted into Canada's Walk of Fame.

In 2005, Robertson received an honorary doctorate from York University. In 2006, he received the Governor General's Performing Arts Award for Lifetime Artistic Achievement, Canada's highest honour in the performing arts. In 2008, Robertson and the Band received the Grammy Lifetime Achievement Award.

In 2011, Robertson was inducted into the Canadian Songwriters Hall of Fame. On May 27, 2011, Robertson was made an Officer of the Order of Canada by Governor General David Johnston.

In 2014, the Band was inducted into Canada's Walk of Fame.

October 14, 2017 Robbie Robertson receives the Lifetime Achievement Award at the Native American Music Awards 

In 2019, Robertson was given a key to the city of Toronto by Mayor John Tory during a TIFF press conference for Once Were Brothers: Robbie Robertson and The Band, a documentary about Robertson.

2019 Robbie Robertson the recipient of the Lifetime Achievement Award in the Canadian Music Industry Hall of Fame from Canadian Music Week (CMW)

As author
Robertson co-authored Legends, Icons and Rebels: Music That Changed the World with his son, Sebastian Robertson, and colleagues Jim Guerinot and Jared Levine. He also wrote Hiawatha and the Peacemaker, illustrated by David Shannon. His autobiography, Testimony, written over the course of five years, was published by Crown Archetype in November 2016.

Personal life
On March 24, 1968, Robertson married Dominique Bourgeois, a Canadian journalist. They have three children: daughters Alexandra and Delphine and son Sebastian.

In March 2022 Robertson became engaged to his girlfriend of four years, Canadian entrepreneur, restaurateur, and Top Chef Canada judge Janet Zuccarini.

Robertson is a member of the Canadian charity Artists Against Racism.

Discography

Robbie Robertson (1987)
Storyville (1991)
Music for the Native Americans (soundtrack) (1994)
Contact from the Underworld of Redboy (1998)
How to Become Clairvoyant (2011)
Sinematic (2019)

Filmography
1978 – The Last Waltz  (performer/producer)
1980 – Carny  (actor/writer/producer/composer)
1980 – Raging Bull (music producer)
1982 – The King of Comedy (music producer)
1986 – The Color of Money (composer)
1994 – Jimmy Hollywood (composer)
1995 – Robbie Robertson: Going Home (documentary)
1995 – Casino (music consultant)
1995 – The Crossing Guard (actor – Roger)
1996 – Phenomenon (executive soundtrack producer)
1996 – Dakota Exile  (narrator)
1999 – Forces of Nature (creative music consultant)
1999 – Wolves (narrator)
1999 – Any Given Sunday (songs)
2001 – The Life and Times of Robbie Robertson
2002 – Gangs of New York (executive music producer)
2002 – Skins (writer)
2003 – Festival Express (performer)
2004 – Jenifa (executive producer)
2004 – Ladder 49 (original song "Shine Your Light")
2006 – The Departed (music producer)
2007 – Eric Clapton: Crossroads Guitar Festival 2007 (performer)
2010 – Shutter Island (music supervisor)
2012 – Curse of the Axe (narrator)
2013 – Eric Clapton: Crossroads Guitar Festival 2013 (performer)
2013 – The Wolf of Wall Street (executive music producer)
2016 – Silence (executive music producer)
2017 – Rumble: The Indians Who Rocked The World (performer)
2018 – Native America (narrator)
2019 – The Irishman (executive music producer, musical director, musician)
2019 – Once Were Brothers: Robbie Robertson and The Band (himself)
TBA – Killers of the Flower Moon

See also
Notable Aboriginal people of Canada

References

Further reading

External links

Robbie Robertson Interview NAMM Oral History Library (2017)

 
1943 births
Canadian country rock musicians
Canadian expatriate musicians in the United States
Canadian folk rock musicians
Canadian male singers
Canadian people of Jewish descent
Canadian Mohawk people
Canadian rock guitarists
Canadian male guitarists
Canadian rock singers
Canadian singer-songwriters
Cayuga people
First Nations musicians
Governor General's Performing Arts Award winners
Juno Award for Indigenous Music Album of the Year winners
Living people
Musicians from Toronto
Officers of the Order of Canada
The Band members
Indspire Awards
Native American musicians
Jewish Canadian musicians
Jewish rock musicians
Jewish singers
Juno Award for Album of the Year winners
Juno Award for Artist of the Year winners
Jack Richardson Producer of the Year Award winners